A special election was held in  April 26-28, 1791 to fill a vacancy left by the death of Representative-elect James Townsend (P) on May 24, 1790, before the first meeting of the 2nd Congress

Townsend had defeated incumbent William Floyd (A) and, as he died before the first meeting of the 2nd Congress and the special election was won by Thomas Tredwell (A), there was no change of parties between the 1st and 2nd Congress

Election results

References

See also 
List of Special elections to the United States House of Representatives
United States House of Representatives elections in New York, 1790

New York 1791 01
New York 1791 01
1791 01
New York 01
United States House of Representatives 01
United States House of Representatives 1791 01